Arthur Edmund Archer (25 October 1871 – 17 November 1938) was an Australian rules footballer who played for the St Kilda Football Club in the Victorian Football League (VFL).

Family
The son of Walter Edmund Archer (1823-1892), and Elizabeth Ann Archer (1832-1903), née Harner, Arthur Edmund Archer was born in Prahran, Victoria on 25 October 1871.

Football

St. Kilda (VFA)
He played for St. Kilda in the VFA from 1893 to 1896.

Fremantle Football Club (WAFA)
He played for the Fremantle Football Club in 1897.

St. Kilda (VFL)
He played for St. Kilda in the VFL in 1898. His knee was so badly injured during the round 7 match against Carlton on 18 June 1898 that he had to leave the field. He never played senior VFL football again.

Death
He died at the Caulfield Repatriation Hospital on 17 November 1938.

Footnotes

References 
 World War One Embarkation Roll: Private Arthur Archer (5130), Australian War Memorial.
 World War One Nominal Roll: Private Arthur Archer (5130), Australian War Memorial.
 World War One Service Record: Private Arthur Archer (5130), National Archives of Australia.

External links 

1871 births
1938 deaths
Australian rules footballers from Melbourne
Fremantle Football Club (1881–1899) players
St Kilda Football Club players
Australian military personnel of World War I
Military personnel from Melbourne